East Coast Grill & Raw Bar, commonly known as East Coast Grill, was a seafood and barbecue restaurant in the Inman Square neighborhood of Cambridge, Massachusetts.  It was opened by Chris Schlesinger in 1985.  The restaurant was famous for their annual Hell Night which focused on super-spicy foods.

The restaurant was sold in 2012 when it was sold to James Lozano, executive chef Jason Herd and general manager Robin Greenspan before permanently closed in 2016.

Legacy
The Boston dining scene, before they opened, was “ fancy, pricey and …a tad stodgy … (but East Coast Grill) managed to change the course of Boston’s dining future.”  Staff included Andy Husbands and Tony Maws

Television
The restaurant was featured on Season 1, episode 8 of Man v. Food.  It was also featured in his show Amazing Eats and on season 12 of Food Paradise.

Hell Night
Schlesinger called Hell Night a “Boston institution.”. In 2011, an ambulance had to be called for a diner who passed out from the food.  People who participated had to sign a Liability waiver.

See also 

 List of defunct restaurants of the United States

 List of seafood restaurants

References

1985 establishments in Massachusetts
2016 disestablishments in Massachusetts
Barbecue restaurants in the United States
Defunct barbecue restaurants
Defunct restaurants in Massachusetts
Defunct seafood restaurants in the United States
Restaurants disestablished in 2016
Restaurants established in 1985
Restaurants in Cambridge, Massachusetts
Inman Square